Michael Ijemuan Folorunsho (born 7 February 1998) is an Italian professional footballer who plays as a midfielder for  club Bari, on loan from Napoli.

Career
Folorunsho spent his youth years with Lazio and played for their Under-19 squad. On 18 July 2017, he signed with Serie C club Virtus Francavilla. Folorunsho made his professional Serie C debut for Virtus Francavilla on 26 August 2017, in a game against Lecce. He played 60 Serie C games for Virtus Francavilla in the two seasons.

On 13 July 2019, Folorunsho signed for Serie A club Napoli on a permanent deal. He was loaned out two days later to Serie C club Bari for two years. Napoli sent Folorunsho on loan to several clubs in the Serie B: Reggina in 2020–21, Pordenone and Reggina in 2021–22, and Bari in 2022–23.

Personal life 
Folorunsho is of Nigerian descent.

References

External links
 

1998 births
Footballers from Rome
Italian people of Nigerian descent
Italian sportspeople of African descent
Living people
Italian footballers
Association football midfielders
Virtus Francavilla Calcio players
S.S.C. Napoli players
S.S.C. Bari players
Reggina 1914 players
Pordenone Calcio players
Serie C players
Serie B players